Kampong Ukong is a village in the central part of Tutong District, Brunei, about  from the district town Pekan Tutong. The population of the village proper was 381 in 2016. It is one of the villages within Mukim Ukong, a mukim in the district.

Administration 

School 
The village primary school is Dato Pemancha Saging Ukong Primary School. It also shares grounds with Dato Pemancha Saging Ukong Religious School, the village school for the country's Islamic religious primary education.

References 

Ukong